Crocus alexandri is a species of flowering plant in the genus Crocus of the family Iridaceae. It is a cormous perennial native from Serbia to southwest Bulgaria and Greece.

References

alexandri